Christian Sean Malcolm (born 3 June 1979) is a retired Welsh track and field athlete who specialised in the 200 metres. In 2020 he was appointed Head Coach of the British Athletics Olympic Programme.

Early life
Malcolm was born and was brought up in Newport, where he still lives. He is of Jamaican descent.

When Malcolm was 15 years old, he was offered a contract by English football club Nottingham Forest, having had trials earlier with them and Queens Park Rangers as a young forward. In a 1998 interview, Malcolm claimed he chose athletics as in his view it is a "friendlier sport and you're not as likely to get kicked around the pitch".

Education
Malcolm was educated at two state schools in Newport: Eveswell Primary School and Hartridge High School.

Life and career
Malcolm won the title of World Junior Athlete of the Year in 1998 and at the 1998 World Junior Championships, he won the 100m in 10.12 seconds and the 200m in 20.44 seconds, becoming the second sprinter to achieve this double at the Junior Worlds, after Ato Boldon. His winning time in the 100m set a new Welsh senior and British junior record, and his winning margin of 0.22 seconds was the largest in the history of the 100m at the Junior Worlds at the time. At that year's Commonwealth Games, his 20.29 for the silver medal was a European Junior and Welsh senior record.

Malcolm took the 2000 European Indoor gold medal in 20.54, for a Welsh Indoor record. Outdoors he led off for the sprint relay team on the first day and ran a season's best of 20.45 to win the 200m on the second day at the European Cup. He went on to 2nd at the AAAs and to excel at the 2000 Olympics to take fifth place at 200m in 20.23.

In 2001, Malcolm took the World Indoor silver medal. Outdoors he was 3rd at 100m and 2nd at 200m at the AAAs and at the World Championships ran eight races to make the finals at both 100m and 200m, finishing 6th and 5th respectively. He also competed as part of the relay team, however, the baton was dropped in the heats. He set two new Welsh records at the Worlds, clocking 10.11 in the 100m final and 20.08 in the semi-finals of the 200m. The 200m final was one of the closest finishes in a major sprint event in history, with Malcolm's final time of 20.22 being just two hundredths of a second down on second, third and fourth placed athletes Christopher Williams, Shawn Crawford and Kim Collins.

After four-second places at the AAAs, Malcolm finally won the 200m in 2005 in a narrow decision over Marlon Devonish and was also 3rd at 100m. He surprised even himself with a brilliant win at the European Cup in 20.15, his best time for five years.

Malcolm represented Great Britain at the 2008 Summer Olympics in Beijing. He competed at the 200 metres and placed second in his first round heat after Brian Dzingai in a time of 20.42 seconds. He improved his time in the second round to 20.30 seconds and placed fourth in his race, normally not enough to advance to the semi-finals, but his time was among the four fastest losing times and he qualified after all. With 20.25 in his semi-final race he even managed to qualify for the final, finishing fourth in his race, eliminating Paul Hession and Christopher Williams. In the final he came in seventh at 20.40 seconds, but as a result of the disqualifications of Churandy Martina (second) and Wallace Spearmon (third) he moved up to the fifth place overall.

At the 2010 Commonwealth Games in Delhi, Malcolm, representing Wales, was one of the favourites to win the men's 200m, and took the bronze medal.

Malcolm retired from competition in 2014 after failing to be selected to the Welsh team for that year's Commonwealth Games in Glasgow due to injury. He competed at four Commonwealth Games in total, sharing the record for most appearances at the Games by a Welsh track and field athlete with Ron Jones, Steve Jones, Colin Jackson and Berwyn Price. He also appeared at four Olympics, and shares the record for most appearances by a Welsh track and field athlete at the Olympics with Jackson. In addition Malcolm won nine senior sprint titles at the Welsh national championships.

After retirement, he became a non-executive director of Welsh Athletics, and subsequently served as British Athletics' technical lead for sprint relays from 2015 to 2019, and guided the GB men's and women's 4x100m relay squads to a gold and a silver medal respectively at the 2017 World Athletics Championships on home ground in London, an achievement for which he was jointly awarded that year's BBC Sports Personality of the Year Coach Award alongside colleagues Stephen Maguire and Benke Blomkvist. He also served as a performance coach with the Federation of Disability Sport Wales for three years, coaching Jordan Howe to a silver medal in the T35 100m and guiding Rhys Jones to a career-best fourth in the T37 100m at the 2017 World Para Athletics Championships, also held in London. In January 2019 he joined Athletics Australia as Head of Performance and Coaching. On 3 September 2020, British Athletics announced that Malcolm had been appointed Head Coach of the British Athletics Olympic Programme.

International competitions

1Representing Europe
2Did not finish in the final

References

External links

 

1979 births
Living people
Sportspeople from Newport, Wales
British athletics coaches
British male sprinters
Welsh male sprinters
Olympic male sprinters
Olympic athletes of Great Britain
Athletes (track and field) at the 2000 Summer Olympics
Athletes (track and field) at the 2004 Summer Olympics
Athletes (track and field) at the 2008 Summer Olympics
Athletes (track and field) at the 2012 Summer Olympics
Commonwealth Games silver medallists for Wales
Commonwealth Games bronze medallists for Wales
Commonwealth Games medallists in athletics
Athletes (track and field) at the 1998 Commonwealth Games
Athletes (track and field) at the 2002 Commonwealth Games
Athletes (track and field) at the 2006 Commonwealth Games
Athletes (track and field) at the 2010 Commonwealth Games
Goodwill Games medalists in athletics
Competitors at the 2001 Goodwill Games
World Athletics Championships medalists
World Athletics Indoor Championships medalists
World Athletics U20 Championships winners
European Athletics Championships medalists
European Athletics Indoor Championships winners
British Athletics Championships winners
Black British sportsmen
Welsh people of Jamaican descent
British sportspeople of Jamaican descent
Goodwill Games gold medalists in athletics
Medallists at the 1998 Commonwealth Games
Medallists at the 2010 Commonwealth Games